Saint Matthew the Potter, also known as Saint Matthew the Poor, is an Egyptian Christian saint of the 8th century. He was contemporary of Pope Alexander II of Alexandria (704 AD - 729 AD). According to Abu al-Makarim, Saint Matthew the Potter may have also been Coptic Orthodox bishop of the city of Esna. He is the founder of the Monastery of Saint Matthew the Potter.

Life
Saint Matthew the Potter was originally from Bishnai in Egypt. He received his early training as a monk at the Church of the Holy Virgin Mary at al-Maqbabat. After completing his training as a monk, he traveled to Esna then to Asfun, where he founded a monastery that came to be known as the Monastery of Saint Matthew the Potter.

Monastery
The Monastery of Saint Matthew the Potter was destroyed in the 10th century by the Bedouin Arabs during one of their many raids on the Nile Valley and on Christian monasteries. Although it was rebuilt, the monastery became deserted a while later. It has been newly re-inhabited by Coptic Orthodox monks since 1975.

See also
Monastery of Saint Matthew the Potter
Coptic Orthodox Church
Coptic monasticism

References
2000 Years of Coptic Christianity. By Meinardus, Otto F. A. 1999. American University in Cairo Press. .
Christian Egypt: Coptic Art and Monuments Through Two Millennia. By Capuani, Massimo. 1999. Liturgical Press. .
Churches and Monasteries of Egypt and Some Neighboring Countries. By Abu al-Makarim [Abu Salih the Armenian]. Edited and Translated by Evetts, B.T.A. 2001. Gorgias Press. .

External links
Monastery of Saint Matthew the Potter, by Jimmy Dunn

Matthew Potter
Matthew Potter
Matthew Potter
Year of birth unknown